3511 (three thousand, five hundred and eleven) is the natural number following 3510 and preceding 3512.

3511 is a prime number, and is also an emirp: a different prime when its digits are reversed.

3511 is a Wieferich prime, found to be so by N. G. W. H. Beeger in 1922 and the largest known – the only other being 1093.  If any other Wieferich primes exist, they must be greater than 6.7.

3511 is the 27th centered decagonal number.

References

Integers